Warren Fu is an American music video director, illustrator and designer. He has directed videos for artists such as Daft Punk, Pharrell Williams, The Strokes, the Killers, Hayley Williams, Mark Ronson, and Julian Casablancas. Fu is signed to Partizan Entertainment worldwide for commercials and music videos, and Creative Artists Agency for feature films. He was also responsible for designing the concept art for General Grievous, one of the main antagonists in Star Wars Episode III: Revenge of the Sith.

Videography

Music videos

2022
Maggie Rogers - "That's Where I Am"
Maggie Rogers - "Want Want"
Phoenix - “Winter Solstice”

2021
Doja Cat featuring SZA - "Kiss Me More"
Shakira - "Don't Wait Up"

2020
Dua Lipa featuring DaBaby - "Levitating"
Tom Petty - "Something Could Happen"
The Strokes - "Ode to the Mets"
Hayley Williams - "Cinnamon"
Hayley Williams - "Leave It Alone"
Hayley Williams - "Simmer"

2019
Zedd and Kehlani - "Good Thing"
The 1975 - "PEOPLE"
Gesaffelstein & Pharrell Williams - "Blast Off"
Rex Orange County - "10/10"
Zedd and Katy Perry - "365"

2018
The 1975 - "It's Not Living (If It's Not with You)"
The 1975 - "Sincerity Is Scary"
A Tribe Called Quest - "The Space Program"
Paramore - "Rose-Colored Boy"
Chvrches - "Miracle"

2017
Phoenix - "J-Boy"
The Weeknd feat. Daft Punk - "I Feel It Coming"
Lo Moon - "Loveless"

2016
The Growlers - "I'll Be Around"
The Strokes - "Threat of Joy"
Rey Pila - "Surveillance Camera"
Chvrches - "Clearest Blue"

2015
Jeff Lynne's ELO - "When I Was a Boy"
Julian Casablancas+The Voidz - "Human Sadness"
Snoop Dogg feat. Stevie Wonder, Pharrell Williams - "California Roll"
Brandon Flowers - "Still Want You"
 My Dear - "Better Dance"

2014
Weezer - "Back to the Shack"
Har Mar Superstar - "Restless Leg"
Haim - "If I Could Change Your Mind"

2013
Daft Punk - "Get Lucky"
Daft Punk and Julian Casablancas - "Instant Crush"
The Killers - "Just Another Girl"
Daft Punk - "Lose Yourself to Dance"
Exclamation Pony - "Pseudo Individual"
The Virgins - "Travel Express"
Har Mar Superstar - "Lady You Shot Me"
The Virgins - "Prima Materia"
Depeche Mode - "Soothe My Soul"

2012
The Killers  - "Miss Atomic Bomb"
The Killers  - "Runaways"
The Darkness  - "Everybody Have a Good Time"
The Darkness  - "With a Woman"
Nero  - "Must Be the Feeling"

2011
The Kooks  - "Is It Me"
The Kooks  - "Junk of the Heart (Happy)"
The Strokes  - "Under Cover of Darkness"

2010
Daft Punk  - "Derezzed"
Mark Ronson - "Bang Bang Bang"
Mark Ronson - "The Bike Song"

2009
Julian Casablancas - "11th Dimension"

2008
Little Joy - "No One's Better Sake"

2007
The Strokes - "You Only Live Once" (Alternate version)

2001
Aaliyah - "Aaliyah MTV Promo"

References

External links

Warren Fu at IMVDb

American music video directors
American people of Taiwanese descent
Living people
Year of birth missing (living people)
University of California, Berkeley alumni
Film directors from Illinois